The 28th edition of the World Allround Speed Skating Championships for Women took place on 18 and 19 February 1967 in Deventer at the IJsselstadion ice rink.

Title holder was Valentina Stenina from the Soviet Union.

Distance medalists

Classification

 * = Fell
 DNS = Did not start

Source:

References

Attribution
In Dutch

1960s in speed skating
1960s in women's speed skating
1967 World Allround
1967 in women's speed skating